Barry Halper (December 3, 1939 – December 18, 2005) was an extensive collector of baseball memorabilia who had been a limited partner owning about 1% of the New York Yankees. During the auction of Halper's collection, Sotheby's Auction House called it the "World Series of Sports Auctions."

Life
Halper was born in 1939 and raised in Newark, New Jersey, living near Ruppert Stadium, home of the Newark Bears, then the Triple-A minor league farm team of the New York Yankees.

Halper attended the University of Miami. He then went into his family's paper supply business, where he worked until the company closed in 1992.

Barry was close friends with many baseball legends including Joe DiMaggio, Mickey Mantle, Pete Rose, Don Mattingly and Tommy Lasorda, among other professional athletes, who regularly visited his home to admire the world's most impressive baseball collection. His wife Sharon would cook special meals for those who came to visit "The Cooperstown of New Jersey" in their Livingston home.

Halper had two other passions: Sharing his baseball stories and relationships with the local community at annual round table discussions at Temple B'Nai Abraham and The Burn Center at Saint Barnabas Medical Center. A member of the hospital's board of directors, he helped raise hundreds of thousands of dollars. And when an organization would ask to showcase some of his memorabilia at an event, he would agree while making one request of the group: to make a donation to the burn center. "He always put that Burn Center at Saint Barnabas above everything else," said Marty Appel the Yankees' former public relations director.  "He never had a family member at the unit, he just had a great affection for his hometown hospital where he eventually died at."

A resident of the New Vernon section of Harding Township, New Jersey at the time of his death, Halper had been a longtime resident of Livingston, New Jersey. George Steinbrenner called Halper "a great baseball fan" who was a "dear friend, a valued partner for many years and a decent, genuine person".

Barry Halper died at Saint Barnabas Medical Center in Livingston, New Jersey at the age of 66, in 2005 due to complications from diabetes.

Collection
Halper's baseball memorabilia collection was thought of as the finest, being both extensive and unusual. Many items, such as the uncut strip of T-206 cards with a Honus Wagner, were one of a kind. Halper's collection was housed in his basement, which had been outfitted like a small museum, including a hidden switch to a swing open panel, behind which were most of his game-worn jerseys of famous players. The collection of game used jerseys included the only known examples of such players as Pud Galvin, Christy Mathewson, Cap Anson, King Kelly, Dan Brouthers, and the famed trio of Tinker / Evers / Chance. The infamous Joe Jackson was represented with jerseys from his minor league team as well as his Cleveland Indians jersey. The collection of dead ball era player jerseys was unrivaled.

Some of the notable items in Halper's collection included:

 Ty Cobb's  autographed Philadelphia Athletics Jersey. (Sold for over 300,000 USD.)
 Lou Gehrig's last baseball glove. (Sold for nearly 400,000 USD.)
 Cap Anson's Chicago White Sox jersey
 A glove from Mickey Mantle. (Purchased by Billy Crystal for over 230,000 USD.)
 Mickey Mantle's  New York Yankees World Series ring.
 The  signed sale agreement that marked Babe Ruth's sale by the Boston Red Sox, to the Yankees
 A  ticket to the first World Series.
 Lou Gehrig's 's Yankees hat.
 Ty Cobb's dentures.
 King Kelly's New York jersey
 Christy Mathewson's first minor league jersey (Taunton)

Following the Sotheby's auction, Halper remarked:

Sotheby's released a three-volume book, The Barry Halper Collection of Baseball Memorabilia, that included over 1,500 color photographs of the collection, giving history for many of the items, details about Halper's collection through the years, and a history of baseball.

In 1998, Halper sold the collection, with Major League Baseball purchasing many items, donating them to the Baseball Hall of Fame. The rest were auctioned off by Sotheby's for a record 21.8 million USD.

Controversy and allegations of false provenance 
In October 2010, Hall of Fame spokesman Brad Horn told the New York Post that a Halper-donated jersey, supposedly worn by Shoeless Joe Jackson, was a fake. Horn stated that the logo utilized acrylic coloring first created in 1941. The jersey was removed from display in 2008. Halper gave conflicting statements regarding the provenance of the Jackson jersey. In a 1985 interview, Halper told The Sporting News that it was a “recent acquisition” from Jackson’s family. In 1998, Halper claimed he’d purchased it in the 1950s from Jackson’s widow. Issues of authenticity have been raised with other auctioned items, including items purported to belong to Cy Young, Joe Dimaggio, Mickey Mantle, Ty Cobb, and others.

Subsequent reports alleged that certain items in Halper's collection had, at some prior unknown time, been stolen from the Baseball Hall of Fame, the New York Public Library, or other institutions. There have also been allegations that items in his collection were stolen from the widows or family members of deceased baseball stars.

These accusations have been made primarily by Peter Nash, a rapper-turned-memorabilia collector, culminating in an article that Nash wrote for the New York Post in July 2011. Murray Chass, the long-time baseball writer for The New York Times and personal acquaintance of Halper, opined that Nash's article in the New York Post was "journalistically indefensible" and "defamed the late Barry Halper." Nash's credibility and motivations against Halper have been questioned, given that he has been involved in a long-running litigation with the memorabilia auction house that was instrumental in preparing, organizing, and cataloging Halper's memorabilia auction at Sotheby's in 1999. In that litigation, Nash admitted in court papers to committing fraud against the auction house, and he invoked the Fifth Amendment in response to questions about his own memorabilia transactions to avoid incriminating himself. The court found in favor of the auction house owner, and Nash signed a court order in which he admitted to having committed fraud. The New York Post published some of Nash's accusations, but they have since removed Nash's original article from its website.

References

1939 births
2005 deaths
American collectors
20th-century American Jews
Baseball memorabilia
Deaths from diabetes
New York Yankees owners
People from Harding Township, New Jersey
People from Livingston, New Jersey
Businesspeople from Newark, New Jersey
20th-century American businesspeople
21st-century American Jews